Thakan is an Urdu language Pakistani drama television series directed by Amin Iqbal and written by Faiza Iftikhar. First broadcast in Pakistan by ARY Digital, Thakan features Saba Qamar, Yumna Zaidi, Saba Hameed, Tauqeer Nasir, Saboor Ali, Bindiya, Farooq Zameer, Anusheh Asad, Farah Tufail and Jabran Shahid. It revolves around the plight of a working women who sacrifices her dreams for her family. Premiering on 10 May 2012, Thakan ended its run in Pakistan on 11 October 2012 after telecasting 22 episodes.

In 2014, the serial was broadcast on ARY Zauq. In India, it was broadcast by Zindagi, premiering on 31 August 2014 at 8:55 pm (IST) under the title Kamaau Bitiya. It ended its run in India on 21 September 2014; the show was later re-aired, beginning from 27 October 2014. The show was again re-ran by ARY Network in 2016 on ARY Zindagi.

Plot
Sadaf (Saba Qamar) works extremely hard like a machine day and night to run her family but no one except her grandfather feels sympathy for her or even cares about her. She is the only working member of her family and has to look after her mother, grandfather, younger sister and also a younger brother. Sadaf faces a lot of difficulties, harassment and also criticism at work due to which she has to frequently shift from one job to another, due to the early responsibility she is not able to complete her education and is restricted to small menial jobs. But she still continues to work in order to earn a livelihood and finally finds a stable, suitable and good job for herself. But in spite of working so hard and looking after her family, no one except her grandfather is concerned about her or is even loyal and faithful to her. Except Sadaf's grandfather, everybody is self concerned and selfish. And it happens one day that Sadaf visits her brother's college to pay the fees and gets to know that he had been suspended months back. Spending money on gambling, when confronted, he doesn't reveal the truth and the next day he steals money from home, injures his grandfather and flees, never to come back again. Sadaf's grandfather succumbs to his injuries and dies.

Similarly by and by the various facets of other people also come in front of Sadaf. For instance, Sadaf learns that the man whom she had thought of marrying didn't care about her but instead wanted to marry her as he thought her to be perfect to look after his house and family and similarly her brother-in-law, Khurshid informs her how her mother had refused the marriage proposals that had come for Sadaf in the past seven years to ensure that she remained in the house, worked and earned for the family. This deeply hurts Sadaf and she decides to get married and leave the house. Sadaf's manager at the office, a lady, who happens to be a social worker, had always helped Sadaf in her difficult times and had also offered to help her with marriage. Thus, Sadaf informs her, her wish to get married soon, following which Sadaf's boss decides to get Sadaf married to her own son, Kaashan, who happens to be a divorcee and a father of three kids, as she believes Sadaf to have all the qualities to look after the kids. And after marrying Kaashan, Sadaf does face problems in the initial stage but eventually copes up with them and begins to love Kaashan and his kids and also succeeds in winning Kaashan's and as well the kids' love and starts living a happy married life with him.

But this disturbs Sadaf's ex-boss, who now happens to be her mother-in-law, as she feels Kaashan to be giving more and undue importance to Sadaf. And thus jealous, she hatches a plot against Sadaf to create a bad image of her in the eyes of Kaashan. But her plans fails as Kaashan trusts Sadaf and later also gets to know the truth, leaving her thunderstruck and devastated. And thereafter, Sadaf who had always been cheated and taken advantage of by her loved ones, begins to live a happy life with Kaashan and the kids.

Cast
Saba Qamar as Sadaf
Yumna Zaidi as Mehak
Saba Hameed as Zubaida, Sadaf's mother
Tauqeer Nasir as Kaashan Azmat, Sadaf's husband
Bindiya as Izmat (Kaashan's mother)
Farah Tufail as Deeba, elder sister of Sadaf
Saniya Shamshad as Sofia, Kaashan's daughter
Jabran Shahid as Fareed, Sadaf's younger brother
Anusheh Asad as Roheena, Kaashan's sister-in-law
Farooq Zameer as Sadaf's grandfather
Bilal Qureshi as Jawad
Beena Chaudhary as Zarina
Noor ul Hassan as Khursheed
Tahira Imam as Nadira

 Reception 

 Critical reception 
While reviewing the episodes 5–7, a reviewer from The Express Tribune said it as quite boring and pretty predictable. In an article of DAWN Images'', the reviewer Sadaf Haider praised the nuanced portrayal of the working woman.

References

Urdu-language telenovelas
Pakistani telenovelas
2012 telenovelas
2012 Pakistani television series debuts
2012 Pakistani television series endings
ARY Digital original programming
Zee Zindagi original programming